P. S. Krishnaprasad is a professor at the  Department of Electrical and Computer Engineering (ECE) and  Institute for Systems Research (ISR) of the University of Maryland. A 1977 Harvard PhD, he began his professorial career at Case Western Reserve University's Systems Engineering Department before joining the University of Maryland in 1980. He has also held visiting positions at various American and European universities. P. S. Krishnaprasad has been an IEEE fellow since 1990, and was the 2007 recipient of the Hendrik W. Bode Lecture Prize.

References

External links
   Mathematics Genealogy Project
  Intelligent Servosystems Laboratory

Control theorists
University of Maryland, College Park faculty
Harvard University alumni
Year of birth missing (living people)
Living people